The Sicilian revolution of independence of 1848 occurred in a year replete with revolutions and popular revolts. It commenced on 12 January 1848, and therefore was the first of the numerous revolutions to occur that year.  Three revolutions against Bourbon rule had previously occurred on the island of Sicily starting from 1800: this final one resulted in an independent state surviving for 16 months. The constitution that survived the 16 months was quite advanced for its time in liberal democratic terms, as was the proposal of an Italian confederation of states.  It was in effect a curtain raiser to the end of the Bourbon kingdom of the Two Sicilies which was started by Giuseppe Garibaldi's Expedition of the Thousand in 1860 and culminated with the siege of Gaeta of 1860–1861.

The revolution

Background

The former kingdoms of Naples and Sicily were formally reunited following the 1815 Congress of Vienna to become the Bourbon kingdom of the Two Sicilies.  Both kingdoms had previously comprised the single Kingdom of Sicily (created by the Normans in the 11th century) during the 12th and 13th centuries, and were split in two following the revolt of the Sicilian Vespers in 1282.

The seeds of the revolution of 1848 were sown prior to the Congress of Vienna, in 1814.  This was during the tumultuous Napoleonic period when the Bourbon court was forced to escape from Naples and set up its royal court in Palermo with the assistance of the English navy.  The Sicilian nobles were able to take the opportunity to force on the Bourbons a new constitution for Sicily that was based on the Westminster system of parliamentary government, and was in fact quite a liberal constitution for the time.  However, post Congress of Vienna, Ferdinand IV of Naples (and III of Sicily) immediately abolished the constitution upon returning the royal court to Naples. 

In 1837 a very serious cholera epidemic had caused almost 70 thousand deaths in Sicily that had caused a feeling of mistrust and recriminations towards power in the population, accused of having voluntarily spread pestilence by polluting water and air. Social tension erupted in a popular uprising that broke out in Syracuse and Catania. The hostility of the Sicilians towards the Bourbon rule was due to a number of reasons, which included the suppression of all forms of autonomy of the Sicilian people and the dominance of Neapolitan elements, the poverty of the island, the harsh police regime and violations of the commitments made by the governments of Naples.

Political events after the revolution

The 1848 revolution was substantially organized from, and centered in, Palermo.  The popular nature of the revolt is evident in the fact that posters and notices were being handed out a full three days before the substantive acts of the revolution occurred on 12 January 1848.  The timing was deliberately planned to coincide with the birthday of Ferdinand II of the Two Sicilies, himself born in Palermo in 1810 (during the Napoleonic period mentioned above).

The Sicilian nobles were immediately able to resuscitate the constitution of 1812, which included the principles of representative democracy and the centrality of Parliament in the government of the state. Vincenzo Fardella was elected president of Sicilian Parliament. The idea was also put forward for a confederation of all the states of Italy.  However the Sicilian Parliament was never able to control the well fortified city of Messina, which ultimately would be used to take back the island by force.  Similarly, it was the city of Messina that held out the longest against Garibaldi’s attack on the island in 1860.

Thus Sicily survived as a quasi-independent state for sixteen months, with the Bourbon army taking back full control of the island on 15 May 1849 by force.  The effective head of state during this period was Ruggero Settimo.  On capitulating to the Bourbons, Settimo escaped to Malta where he was received with the full honours of a head of state.  He remained exiled there for the rest of his life and died there in 1863.  Upon the formation of the new Kingdom of Italy in 1861, Settimo was offered the position of first President of the Senate of the newly created national parliament, but he was forced to decline for health reasons.  Nevertheless, this invitation provides more than a casual hint as to the nexus that existed between the events of 1848 and 1860-61 in the History of Italy.

The Revolution which began in Palermo was one of a series of such events in Italy, though perhaps more violent than others. It quickly spread across the island and throughout Italy, where it prompted Charles Albert, King of Sardinia, to follow the example of Ferdinand II and issue a hastily written constitution. In imitation of these events, riots and revolutions followed around Europe at the same time, and may be considered a taste of the socialist revolts to come.

Violence towards Sicilians: massacres, rapes, fires and looting 
At this point, on the evening of September 7, the battle could be said to be practically over. Filangieri, however, dared not let his troops enter the set of alleys that then made up the historic center of Messina: although the regular Sicilian forces had been exterminated or forced to flee, the bombardment of the Bourbons continued on the defenseless city, that is, on the part that had not yet been occupied by the regi, for another seven hours. The soldiers of the Bourbon army gave themselves to the looting and violence against the inhabitants: "(The Swiss and the Napolitani marched only preceded by fires, followed by robberies, looting, murder, rape, etc.) Women were violated in churches, where they hoped for security, and then murdered, priests killed on altars, maidens cut to pieces, old and sick slaughtered in their own beds, whole families moved from the windows or burned inside their homes, the loan mountains looted, the sacred vases fluttered". 

During the days of September 1848 there were numerous cases of civilians who were intentionally killed by Bourbon troops, who in some cases raped women who took refuge in churches before murdering them, killed all the children and murdered sick people in their beds, as happened for example for the elderly farmer Francesco Bombace, octuagenarian, and for the daughter of Letterio Russo, who was beheaded and to whom the breasts were amputated. Homes of foreigners living in Messina were also looted and destroyed, so much so that the English consul Barker reported the incident to his government writing that many English subjects living there were reduced to ruin and that even a diplomat, the consul of Greece and Bavaria M. G.M. Rillian, despite being in uniform, had been wounded by sabre, before his dwelling was also looted and burned down. The Bourbon troops did not spare even the religious buildings from looting. For example, the church of San Domenico, rich in works of art, was first looted of its sacred objects, then burned down and totally destroyed. Loss of life was incalculable. A Bourbon official wrote to his brother, immediately after the capture of Messina, stating that the Neapolitan departments had recaptured the city with a very intense fire and "trampling corpses in every step that progressed for the space of about two miles" and then commenting "What a horror! What a fire!" British Admiral Parker also condemned the work of the Bourbons, and in particular the prolonged terrorist bombardment of the city even after the end of all resistance for eight hours: "The greatest ferocity was shown by the Neapolitans, whose fury was incessant for eight hours, after all resistance had ceased". 

Messina was also troubled by the work of common criminals sent by King Ferdinand II to Sicily against the insurgents and that after tormenting the Sicilians for months with brigand actions (crimes, violence, thefts, etc.) they gave themselves at the time of the fall of the city to its looting, arriving with small boats from Calabria to make loot.

See also
 Kingdom of the Two Sicilies
 Revolutions of 1848
 Revolutions of 1848 in the Italian states

References
 Correnti, Santo (2002) A Short History of Sicily, Les Editions Musae, Montreal.
 Scianò, Giuseppe (2004) Sicilia, Sicilia, Sicilia!, Edizione Anteprima, Palermo (in Italian).

External links 
 

Sicilian rebellions
Revolutions of 1848 in the Italian states
1848 in the Kingdom of the Two Sicilies